Shahab Nama is an Urdu autobiography by renowned Pakistani writer and diplomat Qudrat Ullah Shahab. It is an eyewitness account of the background of the subcontinent's Muslims' independence movement and of the demand, establishment and the history of Pakistan. The 1248-page long book was published posthumously in 1987, shortly after Shahab's death. It is his most notable publication and a bestselling Urdu autobiography.

It covers his childhood, education, work life, admission to Imperial Civil Service, thoughts about Pakistan and his religious and spiritual experiences. Mushfiq Khwaja, a close friend of Shahab, was one of those who criticised the book for its exaggerations, inaccuracies and stretched truths. Considering Shahab's reputation as a man of integrity and a Sufi, Dawn wrote that "he mainly told the truth but there were things that he stretched."

See also
 Aangan (novel)
 Bano Qudsia
 Mumtaz Mufti

References

External links
Shahab Nama at Goodreads

Pakistani autobiographies
Urdu-language novels
Sang-e-Meel Publications books
Urdu-language literature